Antsahavaribe is a town and commune in northern Madagascar. It belongs to the district of Sambava, which is a part of Sava Region. The population of the commune was estimated to be approximately 17,000 in 2001 commune census.

Only primary schooling is available. The majority 90% of the population of the commune are farmers, while an additional 8% receives their livelihood from raising livestock. The most important crop is vanilla, while other important products are coffee, cassava and rice.  Services provide employment for 2% of the population.

References and notes 

Populated places in Sava Region